Zoran Nikolić (Serbian Cyrillic: Зоран Николић; born 28 November 1960) is a Serbian football manager and former player.

Club career
He played for Red Star Belgrade, OFK Kikinda (from 1984–1987), HNK Šibenik, Selangor FA (1989–1991) and Kuala Lumpur FA (from 1991–1995).

During his stint for Kuala Lumpur (1991–1994) he is regarded as the playmaker for the team who have been challenging in all fronts of all competition.
Have trademark in scoring freekicks and long range and great vision in giving final passes which led to Azman Adnan scoring the record 22 goals in a single season for the club. A record till today. Nikolić regarded as one of the finest imports ever played for KLFA alongside Fandi Ahmad, K. Kannan, etc.

References

1960 births
Living people
Footballers from Belgrade
Serbian footballers
Yugoslav footballers
Red Star Belgrade footballers
OFK Kikinda players
HNK Šibenik players
Kuala Lumpur City F.C. players
Expatriate footballers in Malaysia
Yugoslav expatriate footballers
Yugoslav expatriate sportspeople in Malaysia
Association footballers not categorized by position